Bergentheim (Dutch Low Saxon: Baanthum) is a village in the municipality of Hardenberg, the Netherlands. Located between the canal Almelo- De Haandrik and the railway Zwolle-Emmen, the town used to have a railway station, but it was closed in 1975. The building was still there until August 1993.

Overview
It was first mentioned in 1381-1383 as Bergenthem. The etymology is unclear, because it has always contained a "t". Around 1835, a peat excavation concession was obtained by I.A. van Royen. A little settlement with a school, church, shop and pub appeared at the intersection of two canals. In 1840, it was home to 243 people. In 1905, a railway station opened in Bergentheim, and closed in 1975.

There are some sport clubs in Bergentheim, for example the soccer club VV Bergentheim.

Every year at the end of the summer vacation is "feestweek". A lot happens in this week, from the Banthumloop to huttenbouw. Banthumloop is a competition for the best runners and huttenbouw is a three-day event of building huts. Its mostly for the children. But some adults are volunteers for this event.

Industry
Bergentheim used to have a large bread baking factory that was established just after World War II by the Schipper family, known as the NOH (Noord Oost Hoek) bakkerijen, and later Bakkersland. It was closed in the year 2005. Nowadays large employers are the Lensen Toppoint industry for writing instruments and promotional items, and the local Wavin factory.

Notable people 
 Kyra Lamberink (born 1996), track cyclist
 Arne Slot (born 1978), professional football coach

References 

Populated places in Overijssel
Hardenberg